Munich Business School (MBS) is a private international business school located in Munich (Bavaria, Germany). Munich Business School confers degrees exclusively in business administration. It offers one undergraduate Bachelor program, 4 graduate Programs (Masters and MBA), a terminal DBA degree in cooperation with Sheffield Hallam University as well as double degree programs in cooperation with numerous other business schools from around the world. Munich Business School ranks among the top private Business Schools in Germany and in the top 25 performers group regarding internationality and student mobility.

History 
Munich Business School was established in 1991 as part of the European Business Schools International (ebsi) under the name "EBA München" (Europäische Betriebswirtschafts-Akademie München). It became the first state-accredited private university in Bavaria in 1999. It was renamed to "Munich Business School" in 2003. Since steadily expanding its programs, adding an MBA in 2005, a sport management Master in 2011 and a DBA Program in 2015.

Accreditation and rankings 
All MBS Programs are accredited by the Bavarian Ministry for Education, Cultural Affairs, Science and the Arts (Bayerisches Staatsministerium für Bildung und Kultus, Wissenschaft und Kunst) and the FIBAA (first accredited in 2007 and re-accredited in 2013). As first private university in Bavaria, Munich Business School received institutional accreditation by the German Council of Science and Humanities in 2010, granting it an unlimited state accreditation, and confirmed it in 2015.

Study Programs

Bachelor International Business 
 7 semester full-time program

Master International Business 
  3 semester full-time program
  4 semester full-time program for a dual degree. A dual-degree is possible with the following partner universities: National Taiwan Normal University, Florida International University, Boston University, Skema Business School, Bond University, Regent's University London

Master Sports Business and Communication  
  3 semester full-time program
  4 semester full-time program for a dual degree. A dual-degree is possible with the following partner universities: National Taiwan Sport University, Florida International University, Boston University, Skema Business School, Bond University,
Regent's University London

Master of Business Administration (MBA) 
 International Management, 3 semester full-time 
 General Management, 4 semester part-time

Doctor of Business Administration 
 48 months part-time program

Partner Universities

Munich Business School partners with over 60 universities worldwide:

 : UADE Business School (Buenos Aires)
 : Bond University (Gold Coast), University of Melbourne (Melbourne)
 : MCI Management Center Innsbruck (Innsbruck)
 : Brock University (St. Catharines), Université Laval (Québec), University of Victoria (Victoria)
 : Fudan University (Shanghai), Tongji University (Shanghai), University of Hong Kong (Hong Kong)
 : Zagreb School of Economics and Management
 : Skema Business School (Sophia Antipolis/Lille/Paris), INSEEC Business School (Paris/Bordeaux)
 : Oxford Brookes University (Oxford), Regent's University London
 : Corvinus University (Budapest)
 : Università Bocconi (Milan)
 : ITESM/ EGADE Business School (Monterrey)
 : University of Auckland (Auckland)
 : ESAN University (Lima)
 : Cracow University of Economics (Kraków)
 : Singapore Management University (Singapore)
 : University of Cape Town (Cape Town)
 : Seoul National University (Seoul)
 : Universitat Pompeu Fabra (Barcelona)
 : Boston University (Boston), Florida International University (Miami)

Notable lecturers and alumni

Jack Nasher - author and negotiation advisor
Philipp Brinkmann - entrepreneur and CEO of Tripsta S.A.

Student Societies
Students have formed a number of societies:
 students-clubbing e.V.
 MBS Invest e.V.
 MBS innovate!

External links

 Official website
 MBS Insights Blog

References 

Business schools in Germany
For-profit universities and colleges in Europe
Universities and colleges in Munich
Universities of Applied Sciences in Germany
Private universities and colleges in Germany
Educational institutions established in 1991
1991 establishments in Germany